Ashok Jain (1934 – 4 February 1999) was the Chairman of Bennett, Coleman & Co., the parent company of The Times of India and other large newspapers.

FERA violation charges
Ashok Jain was indicted and arrested in 1998, a year before his death, in connection with an alleged violation of the FERA (Foreign Exchange Regulation Act). Again, the Times was accused of distorting facts pertaining to the case, even giving Ashok's indictment by the Enforcement Directorate the tint of a larger conspiracy against the Jain community in general. Adding to the controversy were sacked editor H.K. Dua's claims that his dismissal was retaliation for his refusal to comply with Ashok Jain's request to help him out by using his editorial position to build up public support besides lobbying with politicians. The ED, Delhi, arrested Jain from his Carmichael Road residence in Mumbai after 18 months in various courts.

Personal
Jain was married to Indu Jain by whom he had two sons, Samir Jain, Vineet Jain and a daughter Nandita. He died on 4 February 1999 in Cleveland, United States at age of 64, following a heart transplant on 10 January. Even after his death, his contribution to the society was noted as the managing trustee of the Bharatiya Jnanpith, which is a leading organisation devoted to the promotion and recognition of the best creative writing in Indian languages.

See also
 Agrawal and Agrawal Jain
 Nattal Sahu

References

External links
 Shravak Shiromani Sahoo Shri Shantiprasadji

20th-century Indian Jains
Businesspeople from Uttar Pradesh
The Times Group people
1999 deaths
1934 births
Indian mass media owners
20th-century Indian businesspeople
20th-century Indian philanthropists